Hans Tholstrup (8 February 1901 – 21 September 1946) was a Danish sailor. He competed in the 8 Metre event at the 1936 Summer Olympics.

References

External links
 
 

1901 births
1946 deaths
Danish male sailors (sport)
Olympic sailors of Denmark
Sailors at the 1936 Summer Olympics – 8 Metre
People from Greve Municipality
Sportspeople from Copenhagen